Sirdaryo Region is one of the regions of Uzbekistan, located in the center of the country on the left bank of Syr Darya River. It borders with Kazakhstan, Tajikistan, Tashkent Region, and Jizzakh Region. The population is estimated to be 860,900 (2021). 

The capital is the city of Guliston (pop. est. 91,300, 2021). Other cities and towns include Baxt, Boyovut, Farhod, Qahramon, Sayxun, Sirdaryo, Khavast, Shirin and Yangiyer.

Demography
The population of the region is distributed along the main highway, which divides the whole region into two parts: the western and the eastern. The population in mainly Uzbek, with Tajik minorities on the border in the south with Tajikistan (mainly Khavast district).

Administration

The Sirdaryo Region consists of 8 districts (listed below) and three district-level cities: Guliston, Shirin and Yangiyer.

There are 5 cities (Guliston, Shirin, Yangiyer, Sirdaryo, Baxt) and 25 urban-type settlements in the Sirdaryo Region. In 2004 the Mehnatobod District was abolished and its territory was divided between the Mirzaobod District and the Xovos District.

Climate
The climate is a typically arid continental climate with extreme differences between winter and summer temperatures.

Economy
The economy is based on cotton and cereal crops, with strong reliance on irrigation and on cattle breeding. Minor crops include forage plants, vegetables, melons, gourds, potatoes, maize, a variety of fruit and grapes. Industry consists of construction materials, irrigation equipment and raw-cotton processing.

Syrdarya contains one of Uzbekistan's largest hydroelectric power plants, which generates one third of the country's electricity.

References

External links 
 

 
Regions of Uzbekistan